Zlatko Portner (16 January 1962 – 23 September 2020) was a Serbian handball coach and player who competed for Yugoslavia in the 1988 Summer Olympics.

Club career
After playing for Crvenka, Portner joined Yugoslav champions Metaloplastika, becoming a member of the squad that won consecutive European Cup titles (1984–85 and 1985–86). He also won six consecutive national championships with the club.

During the 1989–90 season, Portner joined Barcelona as a replacement for his compatriot Milan Kalina. He reunited with his former Metaloplastika teammate Veselin Vujović, helping the club win the European Cup in 1991. The next year, Portner went to France and spent two seasons with Vénissieux Rhône-Alpes (1992–1994). He later also played for Swiss teams BSV Bern, TV Zofingen, and BSC Grosshöchstetten.

International career
At international level, Portner represented Yugoslavia in two World Championships, winning the 1986 edition in his debut appearance. He was also a member of the team that won the bronze medal at the 1988 Summer Olympics.

Coaching career
While playing in Switzerland, Portner started his coaching career with BSV Bern. He also served as head coach of several other Swiss teams.

Personal life
Portner was the father of fellow handball player Nikola Portner.

Honours
Metaloplastika
 Yugoslav Handball Championship: 1982–83, 1983–84, 1984–85, 1985–86, 1986–87, 1987–88
 Yugoslav Handball Cup: 1982–83, 1983–84, 1985–86
 European Cup: 1984–85, 1985–86
Barcelona
 Liga ASOBAL: 1989–90, 1990–91, 1991–92
 European Cup: 1990–91

References

External links
 Olympic record
 Handball Schweiz profile
 

1962 births
2020 deaths
People from Ruma
Naturalised citizens of Switzerland
Serbian male handball players
Yugoslav male handball players
Olympic handball players of Yugoslavia
Olympic bronze medalists for Yugoslavia
Handball players at the 1988 Summer Olympics
Olympic medalists in handball
Medalists at the 1988 Summer Olympics
RK Crvenka players
RK Metaloplastika players
FC Barcelona Handbol players
Liga ASOBAL players
Expatriate handball players
Yugoslav expatriate sportspeople in Spain
Serbia and Montenegro expatriate sportspeople in France
Serbia and Montenegro expatriate sportspeople in Switzerland
Serbian handball coaches